is a railway station in the city of  Uozu, Toyama, Japan, operated by the private railway operator Toyama Chihō Railway.

Lines

Station layout 
The station has one ground-level side platform serving a single bi-directional track. The station is staffed.

History
Kyōden Station was opened on 1 October 1936.

Adjacent stations

Passenger statistics
In fiscal 2015, the station was used by 928 passengers daily.

Surrounding area 
 Kyōden Post Office
 Kyōden Fishing Port
Uozu Industrial High School
 Kyōden Elementary School

See also
 List of railway stations in Japan

References

External links

 

Railway stations in Toyama Prefecture
Railway stations in Japan opened in 1936
Stations of Toyama Chihō Railway
Uozu, Toyama